The R323 is a Regional Route in South Africa that connects Riversdale in the south with Laingsburg in the north.

Route
Its southern origin is from the N2 at Riversdale. It traverses the town, and leaves heading north. It runs through Garcia's Pass and eventually reaches an intersection with the R62 near Ladismith. From this intersection, it is briefly co-signed with the R62 heading east, before again diverging, heading west-north-west. After about 50 km it loops around to eventually head east before veering north towards Laingsburg. Before reaching the town, it crosses the Rooinek Pass. The route ends in Laingsburg at the N1.

External links
 Routes Travel Info
 Garcia's Pass
 Rooinek Pass

References

Regional Routes in the Western Cape